Ostroróg  is a village in the administrative district of Gmina Czaplinek, within Drawsko County, West Pomeranian Voivodeship, in north-western Poland.

It was a royal village of the Polish Crown.

References

Villages in Drawsko County